Ben Stiller is an American actor, comedian, director, producer and screenwriter. The following is his complete filmography. He has mostly appeared in comedy films. Stiller is an Emmy Award winner for his directed, produced and written television show The Ben Stiller Show.

Film

Television

Video games

Music videos

Web series

References

External links 
 

Male actor filmographies
Director filmographies
American filmographies